Payena gigas is a tree in the family Sapotaceae. The bark is greyish to brown. Inflorescences bear up to eight flowers. The specific epithet  is from the Greek meaning "giant", referring to the tree's large size. P. gigas is endemic to Borneo and known only from Sabah.

References

gigas
Endemic flora of Borneo
Trees of Borneo
Flora of Sabah
Plants described in 1958